Andrew Beckwith (born March 22, 1995) is a former American professional baseball pitcher.

Career
Andrew Beckwith attended Blythewood High School in Blythewood, South Carolina, prior to enrolling at Coastal Carolina University. In 2016, he was named the Big South Conference Pitcher of the Year. In the 2016 College World Series, Beckwith started three games for Coastal Carolina, allowing two earned runs in  innings pitched. Beckwith was named the College World Series Most Outstanding Player, finishing his junior season with a 15–1 win–loss record and a 1.85 earned run average in 117 innings pitched. Beckwith returned to relief for the Chanticleers in his senior year.

The Kansas City Royals selected Beckwith in the 32nd round of the 2017 Major League Baseball draft. Beckwith signed with the Royals and spent the 2017 season with both the AZL Royals and the Idaho Falls Chukars, posting a combined 1–0 record and 3.29 ERA in 16 games between both clubs.

Beckwith began 2019 with the Northwest Arkansas Naturals.

References

External links

1995 births
Living people
People from Blythewood, South Carolina
Baseball players from South Carolina
Baseball pitchers
Coastal Carolina Chanticleers baseball players
College World Series Most Outstanding Player Award winners
Arizona League Royals players
Idaho Falls Chukars players
Lexington Legends players
Wilmington Blue Rocks players
Northwest Arkansas Naturals players